The Lepidopterists' Society is a non-profit organization dedicated to the study of butterflies and moths (Lepidoptera). Founded in 1947 and based in the United States, it has an international focus and membership.

Publications 

The society's main organ is the Journal of the Lepidopterists' Society, which has been published continuously since 1947. Back issues up and including 2009 are freely available and hosted by the Peabody Museum of Natural History at Yale University. Subsequent issues are available via BioOne.

Since 1959, the society has also published a quarterly newsletter, the News of the Lepidopterists' Society. All back issues of this, too, are available from the Peabody Museum.

A series of occasional papers is called Memoirs:

 Memoir 1. A Synonmyic List of the Neractic Rhophalocera. C. F. dos Passos, 1964
 Memoir 2. A Catalogue/Checklist of the Butterflies of America North of Mexico. L. D. Miller and F. M. Brown, 1981.
 Memoir 3. Supplement to: A Catalogue/Checklist of the Butterflies of America North of Mexico. C. D. Ferris (ed.), 1989
 Memoir 4. Foodplants of World Saturniidae. S. E. Stone, 1991
 Memoir 5. Basic Techniques for Observing and Studying Moths and Butterflies. W. D. Winter, Jr., 2000

They are also available via the Peabody.

Other publications include:

 The Lepidopterists' Society Commemorative Volume 1945-1973. R. Kendall (compiler), 1977

Presidents 

The society's first president, in 1951, was James Halliday McDunnough of the Nova Scotia Museum of Science. The next year, he was succeeded by the German-British entomologist Karl Jordan, of the Zoological Museum, Tring, England.

Awards 

The society awards a Karl Jordan Medal, initiated in 1972, in honor of Jordan. The first recipient was Henri Stempffer.

A full list of recipients is:

 
 
 
 
 
 
  
 
 
 
 
 
 
 
 
 
 
 
 
 
  
 
 
 
 
 
 
 

The society also grants honorary life memberships, such as that conferred on Lincoln Brower.

References

External links 

 

Learned societies of the United States
1947 establishments in the United States
Non-profit organizations based in the United States
Lepidopterology
Zoological societies
Entomological societies